Bill Skinner (December 27, 1939 – October 5, 2015) was an American javelin thrower. He held the national title in 1970 and 1971 and won a silver medal at the 1971 Pan American Games.

Born in Wilmington and raised in New Castle, Delaware, Skinner was trained as metalsmith and welder, as were his father and grandfather. In January 1957, aged 17, he quit high school and enlisted to the U.S. Navy; he completed his service in spring 1961. After that he played semi-professional football with the Wilmington Clippers and trained in boxing and weightlifting before changing to javelin throw. By March 1968 he quit his welding job to attend the University of Tennessee and graduated in industrial education. In 1971, his refusal to shave his mustache led to his removal from the University of Tennessee track team, an infamous incident covered by Sports Illustrated. He continued his javelin career throwing for the New York Athletic Club. In 1971 he captained the U.S. team at the Pan American Games. Later that year he received an elbow injury and was stabbed while trying to stop a bar fight in Knoxville; as a result he missed the 1972 Summer Olympics.

Skinner married in late 1962 and had a daughter. He divorced in 1970. The same year his younger brother, Jimmy, was killed in a car accident after returning from Vietnam. He remarried in 1971 and had two more daughters. After retiring from competitions, Skinner lived in Kentucky and worked for John Deere company. He was inducted into the Delaware Sports Hall of Fame in 1981 and to the Delaware Track and Field Hall of Fame in 1994. He was posthumously inducted into the Tennessee Athletics Hall of Fame in 2016 as part of the first class honoring male athletes. His likeness appears (uncredited) on the side of the original arcade version of the Konami Track & Field (video game). He died of pancreatic cancer aged 75.

References

American male javelin throwers
1939 births
Living people
Pan American Games track and field athletes for the United States
Pan American Games silver medalists for the United States
Pan American Games medalists in athletics (track and field)
Athletes (track and field) at the 1971 Pan American Games
Medalists at the 1971 Pan American Games